Mahackemo (or Mahackamo) was chief of the Norwalke Indians, a small tribe of the Siwanoy, who sold land to Roger Ludlow in 1640 (Old Style or 1641 New Style) which later became Norwalk, Connecticut.

See also
History of Norwalk, Connecticut

References 

Native American leaders
Lenape people
History of Norwalk, Connecticut
17th-century Native Americans
People from Norwalk, Connecticut